Eléanor (or Éléonore) de Roye, princesse de Condé (24 February 1535 – 23 July 1564) was a French noblewoman. She was the eldest daughter and heiress of Charles, seigneur (sire) de Roye and de Muret, comte de Roucy. Her mother, Madeleine de Mailly, dame de Conti, was the daughter of Louise de Montmorency and half-sister of Admiral Coligny, d'Andelot, and Cardinal de Châtillon. Eléanor was the first wife of Louis I de Bourbon, prince de Condé; as such, she was the sister-in-law of Antoine of Navarre and aunt of King Henry IV.

Eléanor inherited the county of Roucy through her father and the lordship of Conti through her mother. On  22 June 1551, she married Louis I de Bourbon, prince de Condé at age sixteen, and converted him to the Reformed (Protestant) faith. They had eight children, of whom only two, Henri and François, were to have progeny.

During the first of the French Civil Wars, especially between 1560 and 1563, Eléanor and her mother were engaged in important political activities in support of her husband, the Prince of Condé. Twice while Condé was a prisoner of the ultra-catholic Guise family, his wife and mother-in-law systematically reinforced his alliances with Protestant German princes and with Elizabeth I of England. Armed with this support, Eléanor made negotiations by letter and by direct contact with the regent, Catherine de' Medici; the outcome was the Peace of Amboise and the release of her husband.

She died in July 1564.

Ancestors

Notes

References

Eleanor
Eleanor
Eleanor
French people of the French Wars of Religion
Eleanor
1535 births
1564 deaths
French suo jure nobility
French duchesses